The Kings of Frog Island are an English stoner rock collective drawing from psychedelic and retro rock traditions. The Kings of Frog Island formed in Leicester, England  (hence Frog Island) in 2003, as a collaboration between guitarist and producer Mark Buteux, along with R. "Doj" Watson, a founding member of the grunge/punk group Scum Pups and Mat Bethancourt, of the rock bands Josiah and The Beginning. The band released their debut, self-titled album with German-based Elektrohasch Records in 2005. Work on the first album involved some input from guest artists associated with members of the band's musical past, most notably, Matthew (Midge) Day of Scum Pups. Mathew Bethancourt left The Kings Of Frog Island in 2010 to concentrate on Cherry Choke, while Mark Buteux, Gavin Searle, Gavin Wright, Tony Heslop and Roger ‘Doj’ Watson continued work producing a fourth, fifth, sixth, and seventh album as The Kings of Frog Island. They run Amphibia Sound Studios VI and are working on forthcoming projects and collaborations with Bulletree Filmes of Brazil.

Members
 Mark Buteux
 Gavin Searle
 Lee Madel-Toner
 Roger (Doj) Watson
 Tony Heslop
Other members and collaborators include:
 Mat Bethancourt
 Matthew Day (Midge)
 Gavin Wright
 Julia Dream
 Gregg Hunt
 Leia Buteux
 Neve Buteux
 Scarlett Searle

Discography

 The Kings of Frog Island (2005)
 II (2008)
 III (2010)
 IV (2013)
 V (2014)
 IV (2016)
 VI (2020)
 The Kings Of Frog Island 6.5 (2021)
 VII (2021)
 Stayfree (2022)

Track Listing:

External links
Josiah
Scum Pups
Elektrohasch Records

English rock music groups
Musical groups from Leicester
English stoner rock musical groups